Sarah Rijkes (born 2 April 1991) is an Austrian professional racing cyclist, who currently rides for UCI Women's Continental Team . She is an all-rounder with a preference for hilly stage races.

Career
Born in Waidhofen an der Ybbs, Rijkes came to competitive cycling through her Dutch father. As her first Elite racing team she joined the Austrian ARBÖ Löffler Ladies Team from her hometown Waidhofen an der Ybbs, where her mother worked as a team official. Her first professional team was the Austrian outlet Squadra Scappatella, which she joined in 2013. Only a few months after the season started, Rijkes suffered a major setback as she crashed heavily at the Tour of Chongming Island world cup race in China and missed almost the entire season, not returning to racing before September. Despite her unlucky season, Rijkes managed to get her first professional contract abroad in 2014 when she joined the  team in Belgium.

Rijkes competed for Austria in the road races of the 2015 UCI Road World Championships in Richmond, where she did not finish, and the 2016 UCI Road World Championships in Doha, where she finished 63rd.

Personal life
Rijkes has a Dutch surname with her father being from the Netherlands. She is fluent in Dutch. Besides her career in professional cycling she is currently also studying biology.

Major results
2008
 3rd Time trial, National Junior Road Championships
2009
 2nd Time trial, National Junior Road Championships
2011
 2nd Time trial, National Under-23 Road Championships
2012
 2nd Time trial, National Under-23 Road Championships
2014
 National Road Championships
4th Time trial
5th Road race
2016
 3rd Road race, National Road Championships
2018
 1st  Road race, National Road Championships

References

External links
 

1991 births
Living people
Austrian female cyclists
Austrian people of Dutch descent
People from Waidhofen an der Ybbs
Sportspeople from Lower Austria
European Games competitors for Austria
Cyclists at the 2019 European Games
21st-century Austrian women